Tomáš Kubík may refer to:

 Tomáš Kubík (footballer, born 1992), Slovak football player
 Tomáš Kubík (footballer, born 2002), Slovak football player
 Tomáš Kubík (painter) (born 1977), Czech painter